Qmodem was an MS-DOS shareware telecommunications program and terminal emulator.  Qmodem was widely used to access bulletin boards in the 1980s and was well respected in the Bulletin Board System community.  Qmodem was also known as Qmodem SST and QmodemPro.

History
Qmodem was developed by John Friel III in 1984 and sold as shareware through a company called  The Forbin Project.  Qmodem gained in popularity very quickly because it was much faster and had many new features compared to PC-Talk, the dominant shareware IBM PC communications program of that time.

Originally developed in Borland Turbo Pascal, the application originally supported the Xmodem protocol, gradually added support for other protocols such as the popular Zmodem protocol and CompuServe-specific protocols such as CIS-B and CIS-B+.  Qmodem evolved to include features such as the ability to host a simple Bulletin Board System.  The application was sold to Mustang Software in 1991 and in 1992 version 5 of the program was released.

Qmodem Pro
It is a successor of Qmodem, by Mustang Software, Inc. Several versions had been released for MS-DOS and for Microsoft Windows with the final version being QmodemPro 2.1 for Windows 95 and Windows NT which was released July 7, 1997.

QmodemPro continued to be sold by Mustang Software through 2000 when the rights to it were purchased by Quintus Corporation.  Its status is now abandonware.

Awards
1992 John Friel received the Dvorak Award for his development of Qmodem.
1994 Mustang Software, Inc., received the Dvorak Award for QmodemPro for Windows.

Qodem

An independent free software re-implementation of Qmodem for Unix-like systems called Qodem started development in 2003.  Qodem is in active development and has features common to modern communications programs, such as Unicode display, and support for the telnet and ssh network protocols.  It has also been ported to Microsoft Windows.

See also
 List of terminal emulators

References

External links
Mustang Software, Inc. page: QmodemPro

Qmodem release archive

1984 software
Shareware
DOS software
Windows software
Communication software
Discontinued software
Free communication software
Free terminal emulators
Software clones